Anh's Brush with Fame, also known as Anh Do's Brush With Fame, is an Australian television series, first broadcast on the ABC starting 24 August 2016. The program features comedian Anh Do painting a portrait of a celebrity while interviewing his subject.

The celebrities to feature in the inaugural series included Amanda Keller, Jimmy Barnes, Magda Szubanski, Craig McLachlan and Anthony Mundine. The program was renewed for a second series of 10 episodes which aired from 12 April 2017, with singer Jessica Mauboy featured in the first episode. The series 2 finale, featuring Samuel Johnson, was filmed after the initial 10 episodes had been completed and therefore not included in the series 2 DVD set.

Do is an accomplished artist, having won art prizes previously and been a finalist in the prestigious Archibald Prize.

The fourth series premiered on 17 April 2019, the fifth series on 4 August 2020 and the sixth series on 30 March 2021.

In 2021 it was revealed that Do receives assistance in the form of advice from his art teacher Paul Ryan in the early stages of each work, and in some episodes where the guest doesn't have the time for a full sitting the finished painting is prepared in advance from photographs.

Episodes

Series overview

Series 1 (2016)

Series 2 (2017)

Series 3 (2018)

Series 4 (2019)

Series 5 (2020)

Series 6 (2021)

Awards and nominations

References

External links

Australian Broadcasting Corporation original programming
2016 Australian television series debuts
2010s Australian television series
2020s Australian television series
Television shows set in Australia
English-language television shows
Television series by Screentime